Democratic Angola – Coalition (also known as AD–Coligação) is an alliance of political parties in Angola. The leading force in AD–Coligação is the Front for Democracy (FpD). The president of the alliance is Evidor Quiela. The alliance was formed in 1992.

In the 1992 parliamentary election AD–Coligação won one seat in the national assembly, with 0.86% of the national vote. The seat is held by João Vieira Lopes, from the FpD. The presidential candidate of AD–Coligação was Simão Cassete, who got 0,67% of the votes. Cassete left Angola after the elections, and is now the representative of FpD in Europe.

Sources
UNHCR

Political party alliances in Angola
Political parties established in 1992